Dirk Carlson (born 1 April 1998) is a professional footballer who plays for Austrian club SKN St. Pölten on loan from the Dutch club ADO Den Haag as a left back. Born in the United States, he represents the Luxembourg national team.

Club career
Carlson has previously played club football for RFC Union Luxembourg, Union Titus Pétange, Grasshopper Club Zürich, Karlsruher SC and Erzgebirge Aue.

On 6 February 2023, Carlson joined SKN St. Pölten in Austria on loan until the end of the season, with an option to buy.

International career
He made his international debut for the Luxembourg national team in 2016.

References

1998 births
Soccer players from Portland, Oregon
American people of Luxembourgian descent
Living people
Luxembourgian footballers
Luxembourg international footballers
American soccer players
Association football defenders
Racing FC Union Luxembourg players
Union Titus Pétange players
Grasshopper Club Zürich players
Karlsruher SC players
FC Erzgebirge Aue players
ADO Den Haag players
SKN St. Pölten players
Luxembourg National Division players
Swiss 1. Liga (football) players
2. Bundesliga players
Eerste Divisie players
2. Liga (Austria) players
Luxembourgian expatriate footballers
Luxembourgian expatriate sportspeople in Switzerland
Expatriate footballers in Switzerland
Luxembourgian expatriate sportspeople in Germany
Expatriate footballers in Germany
Luxembourgian expatriate sportspeople in the Netherlands
Expatriate footballers in the Netherlands
Luxembourgian expatriate sportspeople in Austria
Expatriate footballers in Austria